William Lacy "Bill" Carter, Jr. (December 2, 1925 – January 25, 2017) was an American politician and businessman.

Born in Memphis, Tennessee, Carter served in the United States Navy during World War II and the Korean War. Carter owned a beer distributorship in Chattanooga, Tennessee. From 1971 to 1974, Carter served in the Tennessee House of Representatives and was a Republican. Carter died at his home in Chattanooga, Tennessee.

References

1925 births
2017 deaths
Politicians from Chattanooga, Tennessee
Politicians from Memphis, Tennessee
Military personnel from Tennessee
Businesspeople from Tennessee
Republican Party members of the Tennessee House of Representatives
20th-century American businesspeople